Ženski rukometni klub Zaječar (Serbian Cyrillic: Женски рукометни клуб Зајечар) is a women's handball club from Zaječar, Serbia. Currently, ŽRK Zaječar competes in the Handball League of Serbia.

Achievements
National Championships :
 Winners (4) : 2009–10, 2010–11, 2011–12, 2012-13
National Cups :
 Winners (4) : 2009–10, 2010–11, 2011–12, 2012-13
EHF Women's Cup Winners' Cup :
 Quartefinalist (1) : 2011-12

Team

Technical staff
 Head Coach:  Saša Bošković
 Physiotherapist:  Nenad Nikodijević

Notable players

  Sanja Damnjanović
  Jelena Erić 
  Katarina Krpež
  Tatjana Medved
  Jelena Nišavić
  Jelena Popović
  Sanja Rajović
  Dijana Števin
  Katarina Tomašević
  Jelena Živković
  Martina Pavić
  Aneta Peraica
  Maja Zebić
  Anett Sopronyi
  Natalija Todorovska
  Tereza Pîslaru
  Barbara Varlec
  Marta Mangué
  Jessica Alonso
  Begoña Fernández
  Nuria Benzal
  Liliia Gorilska

External links
 Official website

Serbian handball clubs
Sport in Zaječar
Handball clubs established in 1949
Women's handball clubs
Women's handball in Serbia